"That That" is a song recorded by South Korean singer Psy and South Korean rapper Suga of BTS for Psy's eighth studio album Psy 9th. The song was written and produced by Psy and Suga. It was released for digital download and streaming on April 29, 2022, as the album's lead single by P Nation.

Background and release 
On April 26, 2022, "That That", was announced as the lead single for Psy's eighth studio album, Psy 9th. The song was written and produced by Psy and Suga. Mixing was handled by Tony Maserati, while mastering was done by Sterling Sound's Chris Gehringer.

The song was released for digital download and streaming by P Nation on April 29, 2022.

Music video 
The music video for "That That" was filmed on a sandy beach in Incheon in mid-March. According to Psy, the weather was cold and rainy, causing some difficulties during filming, as the sand became muddy and made their feet to sink into the ground. It garnered more than 30 million views within 24 hours of its release and 100 million views within a week of its release.

Accolades

Charts

Weekly charts

Monthly charts

Year-end charts

References 

2022 singles
2022 songs
Gaon Digital Chart number-one singles
Korean-language songs
Psy songs
Songs written by Psy
Songs written by Suga (rapper)
Song recordings produced by Suga (rapper)